The National Museum of Modern and Contemporary Art, Korea (MMCA) is a contemporary art museum with four branches in Gwacheon, Deoksugung, Seoul and Cheongju. The museum was first established in 1969 as the only national art museum in the country accommodating modern and contemporary art of Korea and international art of different time periods.

History and architectural style

Gwacheon
The museum was initially established in Gyeongbokgung on October 20, 1969, but was moved to Deoksugung in 1973. It was moved to its current location in 1986. Founded to contribute to the development of Korean contemporary art by systematically conserving and exhibiting artworks created since 1910, the museum's  area of 73,360 m2 spreads over three floors, and has an outdoor sculpture park occupying 33,000 m2. The motif of the architecture is that of a traditional Korean fortress and beacon mound, and the building has a unique spiral- formed interior where Dadaigseon, one of the most famous video artworks by Nam June Paik, is located.

Deoksugung
The first branch of the MMCA was established in 1998 in Seokjo-jeon of Deoksugung (Jeong-dong, Jung-gu, Seoul, South Korea), in order to further increase the museum's accessibility for people living in the northern part of Seoul. It is located at 99 Sejong-daero, Jung-gu in Seoul.

Seoul
The Seoul branch of the museum opened on November 13, 2013, next to Gyeongbokgung. Built on and next to the former Military Defense Security Command building, the architectural design adopted the madang (yard) concept, which successfully integrated the exterior and interior of the building to the surrounding environment. The madang also serves as a public leisure space as well as a space to hold outdoor artistic events and programs. It is located at 30 Samcheong-ro, Sogyeok-dong, Jongno-gu in Seoul.

Cheongju
The MMCA Cheongju, a storage and conservation center, opened in 2018 which also trains professionals in art conservation. It is located at 314 Sangdang-ro, Cheongwon-gu, Cheongju.

Collections and exhibitions

The museum collections is around 10,000 artworks including works of contemporary Korean artists such as Go Hui-dong, Ku Bon-ung, Park Su-geun, and Kim Whan-ki. The museum has also gathered a substantial internationally recognized collection including artworks by Joseph Beuys, Andy Warhol, Georg Baselitz, Jörg Immendorff, Marcus Lüpertz, Nam June Paik, Nikki de Saint-Phalle, Jonathan Borofsky, and Michelangelo Pistoletto.

Past exhibitions include the installation of Sinseon Play - Moon Ji Bang as a part of the Young Architects Program at MoMA and MoMA PS1 in 2014. In 2011, the MMCA hosted the exhibition The American Art, which was "the first occasion to exhibit the Collection of Whitney Museum, in Asia," featuring artists such as Jeff Koons, Andy Warhol, and  Jasper Johns. Likewise in 2010, the museum hosted the exhibition Picasso and Modern Art, which was the first exhibition of collections from the Albertina Museum (Vienna, Austria)  in an East Asian country. In addition to loan exhibitions, the MMCA has mounted special exhibitions of Korean art, such as Acquisitions in Korean Art 1960–1980, and Masterpieces of Korean Modern Art: Exploration of Modern History in 2008. Since 2012, the Museum of Modern and Contemporary Art (MMCA) and SBS Cultural Foundation have co-sponsored the annual Korea Artist Prize, which recognizes and supports innovative Korean visual artists. The four artists shortlisted for the Korea Artist Prize 2021 are Bang Jeong-a, Kim Sang-jin, Oh Min and Choi Chan-sook.

In 2021, the National Museum of Modern and Contemporary Art received close to 1,500 works of art as a donation from the estate of the late Lee Kun-hee. The collection of paintings, drawings and sculptures represented the single largest contribution received by the museum "in terms of both value and scale". More than 90% of the pieces are made by contemporary Korean artists, including over 100 works by painter Lee Jung-seob and almost 70 works by craftsman Yoo Kangyul. Other notable western artists in the donation include Paul Gauguin, Pierre-Auguste Renoir, Camille Pissarro, Marc Chagall, Salvador Dalí and Joan Miró.

Performing Arts

MMCA Performing Arts 2022: Museum-Carbon Project 
As the global issue of climate change brought on by greenhouse gases is getting worse, a series of multidisciplinary events under MMCA Performing Arts 2022: Museum-Carbon-Project focuses on how we should adapt to climate change through discussions, exhibition waste disposal, materials and artwork manufacture, artwork packaging, and shipping process.

Departments

Education
The MMCA has various art education programs including professional education programs for curators, employees of museums, art teachers, and college students. The Children's Museum is located in Gwacheon main museum, where programs for elementary students, disabled students and students from poor neighborhoods are held. There is also a special support program for young artists, called 'Residency,' in which the museum provides studios for selected young artists and holds art conversations among artists and art professionals.

Research and conservation
The conservation center of the museum was first established in 1980. The center has been working to develop its modern techniques for conservation by holding exchange programs with overseas conservation centers. Currently, the center is divided into four professional departments: oil paintings, Korean traditional artworks, contemporary sculptures, and medium of artworks. Furthermore, the museum opened its 'Art Research Center' in 2013, which focuses on the research of East Asian contemporary art.

 What Do Museums Connect?: Museums in a Post-Pandemic World (2021) discusses how to define the new responsibilities that museums must play in light of contemporary cultural, social, and technical contexts.
 Research Forum: Re-inventing Archive: Design, Architecture, Visual Culture (2019) aims to create a venue for gathering, analyzing, and examining the design, architectural, and visual cultural legacies, as well as examining how to connect them to the present.
 Project Talk: The Creative Synthesis of Museum and University discusses the future of "Museum-University" which aims to connect museums with institutions.
 Worlds at Stake: Contemporary Art, Visual Culture, and Political Ecology go over the most recent findings on the end of the world and what follows next.
 What Do Museums Change? — Art and Democracy addresses specific action plans to make modern museums and support movements outside of institutions for quick advancement and community transformation.
 “What Do Museums Collect?” explores the functions of museums through a number of crucial verbs, including "study" and "collect," which are issues that are particularly important right now because of the flux in the policies and curatorial trajectories surrounding art and artwork.

Publications 

 MMCA Artist Studies 1 IM Heung-soon: Toward a Poetics of Opacity and Hauntology (2018)

IM Heung-soon’s work from the late 1990s to the present is studied in MMCA Artist Studies. IM has experienced trauma related to the Vietnam War, the women's labour movement, and the Jeju Uprising, which lead him to transform his past experience into contemporary art. This book's title in Korean is "Red, Blue, and Yellow” and was changed to "IM Heung-soon: Towards the Poetics of Opacity and Hauntology". 

 What Museums Do 2 〈What Do Museums Collect?〉(2019)

This book discusses a wide range of topics, including the practice of inclusion and the function of modern museums in relation to cultural diversity.

 MMCA Artist Studies 2 Park Chan-kyong: Red Asia Complex (2019)

The idea behind the book's title, Red Asia Complex, has long been present in both Park's writing and art. The "Asia complex" proposes the postcolonial perspective if the "Red complex" is the motivating factor behind the mental geography that Park has investigated in relation to Korea's Cold War division culture.

 MMCA Studies 13: Exhibition Histories (2021)

This publication is focusing on the theme of exhibition history which includes the approach to studying art history, the role of exhibition design, and analysis of the examination of Young Korean Artists in 1981.

Controversies
Shortly after its opening, members of the Korean Fine Arts Association and other artist organizations protested over the selection of art for inclusion, charging the Director, a graduate of Seoul National University, with a bias toward graduates of that school, noting that 32 of the 39 artists represented in the exhibition Zeitgeist Korea are from his alma mater.

See also
List of museums in South Korea
List of Korean painters
Korean painting

References

External links

 http://www.mmca.go.kr/exhibitions/exhibitionsDetail.do?menuId=1010000000&exhId=201311010002927
 Inauguration: http://blog.naver.com/imga114?Redirect=Log&logNo=120202629527
 Kwon Mee-yoo (2013) "Traditional, Modern Artists in Conflict over Exhibiting at Deoksu Palace," The Korea Times online https://www.koreatimes.co.kr/www/news/culture/2013/11/148_146577.html . 2013-11-20.  Retrieved 2013-12-01.
 Kwaak, Jeyup S. (2013) "Seoul's New Modern Art Museum Opens," Wall Street Journal online https://blogs.wsj.com/scene/2013/11/14/seouls-new-temple-to-high-tech-art/. 2013-11-14.   Retrieved 2013-12-01

Art museums and galleries in South Korea
2013 establishments in South Korea